Oxindole (2-indolone) is an aromatic heterocyclic organic compound with the formula C6H4CHC(O)NH. It has a bicyclic structure, consisting of a six-membered benzene ring fused to a five-membered nitrogen-containing ring. Oxindole is a modified indoline with a substituted carbonyl at the second position of the 5-member indoline ring.  Classified as a cyclic amide, it is a pale yellow solid.

Formation and reactions
Oxindole is derived in nature from tryptophan, formed by gut bacteria ("normal flora"). It is normally metabolized and detoxified from the body by the liver. In excess, it can cause sedation, muscle weakness, hypotension, and coma. Patients with hepatic encephalopathy have been recorded to have elevated serum oxindole levels.

Treatment with phosphorus pentasulfide gives the thione.

Oxindoles

Beyond, the parent compound, oxindoles include many compounds. One example is 3-methyloxindole.

References

Indolines
Lactams